is a 2006 Japanese romance and drama film based on the novel  written by Takuji Ichikawa. It was also released as a manga. The film was directed by Takehiko Shinjo, and focuses on the relationship that evolves between a photographer named Makoto, and two of his female university classmates, Shizuru and Miyuki.

Plot
Makoto, a freshman on his first day at university, meets a cute girl named Shizuru. Makoto is normally shy around people, but is attracted to Shizuru for her childlike appearance and behavior. Shizuru wants to be with Makoto, so she develops an interest in his hobby of photography. The two spend time together taking photos in a nearby forest. However, Makoto soon develops stronger feelings for another student named Miyuki, who is beautiful and more well developed. Shizuru, seeing this, hints to Makoto that she will grow up to be a beautiful woman, and he will be sorry for not picking her. One day, she tells Makoto that she wants to take a photo of them kissing in the forest as a present for her birthday, which they do.

After this, Shizuru unexpectedly leaves school and is not heard from again for two years. Makoto receives a letter asking him to come to New York to see Shizuru's debut photography exhibit. By then Makoto has broken up with Miyuki because he has decided he really loves Shizuru, and will wait for her to return. When he arrives in New York, he is greeted by Miyuki, and finds out that Shizuru was hiding a disease from him, and has died. Apparently when she fell in love with Makoto, and started eating more to "grow up" for him, she accelerated her disease. He goes to the exhibit and sees many photos of himself, and a huge photo of Shizuru all grown up and beautiful, as she had foretold. There is also the photo of the two of them kissing in the forest, with a caption saying that this was her one true love.

Cast
Aoi Miyazaki as Shizuru Satonaka
Hiroshi Tamaki as Makoto Segawa
Meisa Kuroki as Miyuki Toyama
Misa Uehara as Saki Inoue
Munetaka Aoki as Ryo Shirohama
Keisuke Koide as Kyohei Sekiguchi
Asae Ōnishi as Yuka Yaguchi

Soundtrack
The film's theme song, "Ren'ai Shashin" (Love Photo), is a ballad sung by Ai Otsuka. The title of the movie was taken from the lyrics of the song. The single was released by Ai Otsuka on October 25, 2006. In its first week of sales, the single debuted at number 2, being Otsuka's highest debut sales of the year with 77,570 copies sold. The song also won the "Best Video From A Film" and "Best Pop Video" awards at the MTV Video Music Awards Japan 2007.

Reception
Tada, Kimi o Aishiteru earned US$5,311,676 at the Japanese box office.

References

External links
 

Tada, Kimi o Aishiteru at the Japanese Film Database

2006 films
Japanese romantic drama films
Toei Company films
2006 romantic drama films
Films directed by Takehiko Shinjō
Films based on Japanese novels
Films scored by Yoshihiro Ike
Japanese films set in New York City
2000s Japanese films
Foreign films set in the United States